Phyllonemus filinemus is a species of claroteid catfish endemic to Lake Tanganyika on the border of the Democratic Republic of the Congo, Tanzania, Burundi and Zambia. It grows to a length of 8.7 cm (3.4 inches) TL.

References
 

Phyllonemus
Fish of Lake Tanganyika
Fish described in 1937
Taxa named by E. Barton Worthington
Taxa named by Kate Bertram
Taxonomy articles created by Polbot